Arthrocaulon is a genus of flowering plants belonging to the family Amaranthaceae.

Its native range is Macaronesia, Mediterranean to Arabian Peninsula and Senegal, Angola.

Species:

Arthrocaulon franzii 
Arthrocaulon macrostachyum 
Arthrocaulon meridionalis

References

Amaranthaceae
Amaranthaceae genera